This Man is the first studio album by Canadian country rock artist Cory Marks. It was released on May 26, 2015 through Big Star Recordings.

Background
Marks released his debut Canadian country radio single "Smartphone" in July 2014. The track was one of eight tracks that he co-wrote on the album. Marks co-wrote these tracks during writing trips to Nashville between the Fall of 2012 and November 2014. The second single to radio, "21" was released in April 2015. The title track "This Man" became the third single in August 2015, while "Nowhere With You" was released to radio as the fourth single in January 2016.

Track listing

Singles

Release history

References

2015 albums
Cory Marks albums